{{nihongo|"Koibumi|恋文|lit. Love Letter}}/Good Night" is the 28th single by the Japanese J-pop group Every Little Thing, released on December 15, 2004, and their sixth single to reach the top position at the Oricon chart.

Koibumi is used for one of the commercials of Nobel's Hachimisu Kinkan Nodo Ame candy and the movie Love Letter from Heaven while "Good Night" is used as the opening theme song of the PlayStation 2 Game, Tales of Rebirth. It peaked at first place in the Oricon Sales Chart for 18 straight weeks.

Track listing
  (Words - Kaori Mochida / music - HIKARI)
 Good Night (Words - Kaori Mochida / music - HIKARI)
  (instrumental)
 Good Night (instrumental)

Chart positions

External links
 "/Good Night" information at Avex Network.
 http://www.oricon.co.jp/music/release/d/569438/1/  information at Oricon.

2004 singles
Every Little Thing (band) songs
Oricon Weekly number-one singles
Songs written by Kaori Mochida
Tales (video game series) music
Japanese film songs
Avex Trax singles